Angie Bland (born 26 April 1984) is a Belgian female volleyball player. She is a member of the Belgium women's national volleyball team and played for Volley-Ball Nantes in 2014.

She was part of the Belgian national team at the 2014 FIVB Volleyball Women's World Championship in Italy.

Clubs
  Volley-Ball Nantes (2014)
 🇫🇷 ASPTT Mulhouse (2015–present)

References

External links 
 

1984 births
Living people
Belgian women's volleyball players
Place of birth missing (living people)